Juan Reynoso may refer to:

 Juan Reynoso Guzmán (born 1969), Peruvian footballer
 Juan Reynoso Portillo (1912–2007), Mexican violinist